Zhushan Township is an urban township in the southwest part of Nantou County, Taiwan, and off the south shore of Zhuoshui River.

Geography
Population: 51,800 people

Administrative divisions
Zhushan, Zhongzheng, Zhongshan, Yunlin, Zhuwei, Guilin, Xiaping, Zhonghe, Zhongqi, Xiulin, Daan, Yanhe, Yanxiang, Yanzheng, Yanping, Yanshan, Shanchong, Sheliao, Zhongyang, Fuzhou, Tianzi, Huiyao, Dexing, Fuxing, Liyu, Pingding, Ruizhu and Tongtou Village.

Government agencies
 Central Backup Center of Central Emergency Operation Center

Education
 National Zhushan Senior High School

Tourist attractions
 Chelungpu Fault Preservation Park
 Jiji Weir
 Shanlinxi Forest Recreation Area
 Zhushan Zinan Temple
 Beishi Xigu (north force creek valley)
 Shadonggong National Earthquake Park
 Stair Suspension Bridge
 Sun Link Sea Forest Recreational Area
 Xiaping Natural Education Park
 Momotaro Village

Events
 Chien Chiao Ritual

Transportation

 Railway: no through here, but can boarding the train at Ershui Station.
 Highway: Tai 3 Line, through downtown of Zhushan
 Formosa Freeway Nat'l No.3 Zhushan IC at 243.7 km.

Notable natives
 Min Kao, American businessperson

References

External links

Zhushan Township Office website

Townships in Nantou County